Kuching High School (KHS;), officially Kuching High National-type Secondary School, is a public secondary school in Kuching, the capital of the Malaysian state of Sarawak. The school provides secondary education from Transition to Form 5, which culminates in the sitting of the public examinations of Form Three Assessment in Form 3 and the Malaysian Certificate of Education in Form 5. The school was founded in 1916 as a Chinese private school and from 1963 until today it became a government-aided school.

Location 
The school is located on a  site at Jalan Mathie in Kuching, the capital city of Sarawak, a state in East Malaysia.

History

Background
Kuching High School was founded in 1916 by Kuching Teochew Association, an association for the Teochew people in Kuching, as Min Teck Junior Middle School as a self-funded Chinese school. It was initially located at Jalan Batu. From 1941 to 1946 the school was closed due to the Japanese Occupation. It was reopened in 1946 but under the new name Chung Hua Middle School as well as a new management which was a Joint Board of Management consisting of representatives from thirteen associations in Kuching. At the time it was the only Chinese middle school reopened after the Occupation. In 1958, another Chinese middle school was established at Jalan Pending and it was named as Chung Hua Middle School No. 1, hence the then Chung Hua Middle School was again renamed as Chung Hua Middle School No. 2. It was one of the four Chung Hua Middle Schools under the Board.

After Sarawak joined Malaysia on 16 September 1963, the Sarawak Education Department introduced a ten-year Conversion Plan to bring all Chinese middle schools in the state into the national education system, whereby they would receive government funding and the medium of instruction, which was then in Chinese, would be converted to English, although Chinese would still be taught as a compulsory language subject. Chung Hua Middle School No. 2 decided to be nationalised to receive the funding, thus Teochew Association retook the school's management under the auspice of the parents and the approval of the Education Department. Meanwhile, the other Chung Hua Middle Schools opted out of the plan and thus become the non-aided Chinese independent high schools.

In 1963, the first intake of students under the new national designation had 830 students and 25 classes in both the Chinese and English streams.

Building
In early 1963, the school consisted of a 7 wooden school blocks, such as the administration block built in 1932 which included the general office, staff room, science laboratory and library, as well as six two-storey classroom blocks, two basketball courts, one badminton court and a store-room. In 1974, a two-storey partially wooden science laboratory block was constructed. Due to growing student enrolment, in 1977, the one-storey Block 2 was reconstructed into a two-storey classroom block and the store-room into a three-storey concrete block, which housed science laboratories and uniformed societies, to alleviate overcrowding. In 1988, a four-storey concrete block was built on the basketball court and named Block 6, with the top three floors utilised as classrooms and the ground floor as the canteen, while in 1990, another four-storey concrete block was built to replace Block 6 and named Block 7, with the top-most floor as the science laboratories, ground floor for co-curricular activities and the rest as classrooms.

Block 4 and 5 were demolished to make way for a new three-storey concrete block with a hall, theatre, library and living skills education rooms in 1996. However, it was a failed project as the plan was not approved by the local authorities since the site was made government's reserved land.

In 2000, several parts of the school was renovated, including a new great hall on the badminton/tennis court, a steel canopy joining adjacent Block 6 and 7, a garden between Block 1 and 3 and a concrete wall aligning the school compound along Mathie Road. The following year, the school's jogathon provided MYR 250,000  for building a computer room. In the end of 2002, a cooperatives room and an auditorium was built, while counselor's room was revamped from an old classroom.

In 2004, the roof of the great hall was repaired in response to one that was blown away in a storm and in 2007, the great hall was renovated.

In early 2008, the two-storey Junior Science Block which was an extension of the administration block, consisting the junior science laboratories, red crescent office and staff's toilets together with Block 2 was declared unsafe by the Public Works Department (PWD) due to termite problem and had since become unoccupied.

However, before the school's Board of management received a grant from the Education Ministry to renovate the unsafe blocks, the administration block and Junior Science Block was razed in a fire on 2 December 2008, causing the school in need of    MYR 500,000 for temporarily housing its staff. Construction of the razed blocks would be divided into two phases, viz. phase one for the construction of junior science block and classroom blocks, whereas phase two for administrative block that includes an office, a library, classrooms and a conference room, costing MYR 3.4 million and MYR 2.2 million respectively.  On 23 December 2008, an EGM was held by the Teochew Association to approve amount of MYR 3.2 million to rebuild the block, of which MYR 200,000 for a temporary administration office, and the remaining MYR 3 million to rebuild Block 1 and admin block.

2 December Fire
A fire razed Kuching High School on 2 December 2008 afternoon. The incident started at 1:05pm (GMT+8.00 HRS) when the staff noticed smoke billowing from the Red Crescent Society room at the ground floor of the Junior Science Laboratory and contacted the Civil Defence Department and the Fire and Rescue Services Department. At the same time, the office clerk, teachers and security guards at the site salvage important documents, some files and various equipments including heavy duty printers and computers from the administration block which houses historical documents, students' belongings and computers. The fire then spread to junior science laboratories above the building and administrative block adjacent to the Junior science laboratory block.

In about 40 minutes, the inferno was brought under control by forty-one firefighters with four fire engines and three Rapid Intervention Motorcycles (R.I.M) units from four Fire Departments in Batu Lintang, Tabuan Jaya, Petra Jaya and Padungan. Initial investigations revealed short circuit as the cause of the fire. Despite no casualty recorded, the school was faced with heavy material losses and ensuing financial problem to reconstruct the facilities. In addition to the two-storey Junior science laboratory block that includes junior science laboratories, equipment store room and staff wash room, as well as the adjacent two-storey administration block that includes principal room, staff room, administration room, library, meeting room for staff and students activities, which were burnt down in the blaze, textbooks kept in the Junior science laboratory block for the student's Textbook Loaning Scheme (Skim Pinjaman Buku Text or SPBT) the following school year were also destroyed. Also, the destroyed corporation's property within one of the burnt blocks summed up to a MYR 20,000 lost.

Aftermath
With the reason that classrooms used for the annual SPM examination, which was scheduled until 4 December 2008, were quite a distant from the burning blocks, the students sat for their exam as planned with no hindrance.

An immediate effort was called for to restore the burnt buildings along with those which had been declared unsafe by PWD preceding the calamity. The fire left the School Board of Management with an estimated MYR 6.4 million reconstruction cost. This included MYR 3 million for rebuilding the administration block and MYR 1.4 million for the Junior Science block, which were both razed by the fire, in addition to MYR 2 million for rebuilding Block 2 that consisted of living skills, religious teaching, and equipment storage rooms, which were falling down. To meet ends with its heavy cost, an appeal was made to the Ministry of Education for a grant.

On 23 December 2008, an emergency general meeting (EGM) held by the Teochew Association ordered the construction of a temporary administration office with MYR 200,000. Another MYR 3 million was funded by the meeting to rebuild Block 1 and the admin block for the long run.
Also, the Kuching High Rebuilding Committee, chaired by Mr Kuek Eng Mong, was formed on 6 January 2009 with the support of ex-Highians (alumni), Parent-teacher association, Kuching High School Board of Management, Kuching Teochew Association and other concerned individuals. The school was also blessed with concerns from the state's Deputy Chief Minister Datuk Patinggi Tan Sri Dr George Chan Hong Nam, Malaysian Minister of Plantation Industries and Commodities Datuk Seri Peter Chin Fah Kui, Director of JKR Sarawak Datu Hubert Thian Chong Hui and other local politicians, who became advisors for the reconstruction of the school.

The school is slowly recovering from the calamity with fiscal support from various bodies and communities. Besides MYR 900,000 allocate by the School Board of Management and approximately half million ringgit from insurance claim, the reconstruction projects also received fundings from various bodies, including MYR 1.7 million from the Ministry of Education, MYR 200,000 from Sarawak's government MYR 600,000 from Kuching Teochew Association, MYR 100,000 from SUPP and MYR 120,000 from the school's Parent Teacher Association.
Various fund-raising activities were also organised by the school and alumni. A jogathon organised by the school's parent-teacher association (PTA) on 25 July 2009 saw 400 participants and collected MYR 170,000 from the public.

Academics

Kuching High curriculum, similar to other government high schools, is divided into a three-year lower secondary stage and two-year upper secondary stage. Lower secondary stage consists of Form 1 to Form 3, while Upper Secondary stage consists of Form 4 and Form 5. A one-year Removal class prepares students who have failed their UPSR exam for Form 1.

Compulsory subjects of the lower secondary includes Malay Language, English Language, Mathematics, Science, History, Geography, Design & Technology (Reka Bentuk & Teknologi) or Basic Computer Science (Asas Sains Komputer), Physical Education and Art. Non-Muslim students would have to study Moral Education, while the Muslims students take Islamic studies. The Chinese Language is an elective subject which most students take. Students in Removal classes would have to take Malay Language in Practice (Amali Bahasa Melayu). At the end of Form 3, students would sit for the PT3 examination, and later, they could enter the school's upper secondary stage, where they can choose to enter the art, science or technology ‘streams’. Compulsory subjects, which have to be partaken by students from all three streams include Malay Language, English Language, Mathematics, History, Moral Education/Islamic Studies and Physical Education. Students would sit for the SPM examination administered by the Ministry of education at the end of their Form 5 before graduation.

In addition to the core subjects, Kuching High also offers a broad range of elective subjects for senior students. Generally, Science streams would have Biology, Chemistry, Physics, Additional Mathematics. Both technology and art streams offer Commerce, Science and Art. Computer science enthusiasts could take up Computer Science which is only offered in the technology stream; whereas the art students can take up Accounting Principles.

A popular elective subject in both upper and lower secondary stage of Kuching High is Chinese Language which is taken up by most students, besides the 'G' class.

“Due to its historical past - being a Chinese-converted secondary school since 1963 - Chinese language is essentially an important and popular subject among the students, in line with its justification of conversion and establishment. Till today, this is still looked upon as the soul and spirit of Kuching High, without which the school will be looked upon as "rootless".”

Besides elective subjects taught in classes, some students opt to take additional subjects independently to sit for their SPM examination. The common ones includes Bible knowledge and Chinese literature.

The school has been widely recognised by the public. The Sarawak Foundation  awarded the Chief Minister Excellent School Awards to the school in 2003. It has been deemed the state's Most Promising School by the Education Department of Sarawak in 2002. In SPM 2008, there are 2 students scoring 13A1s, 9 students scoring 12A1s and 33 students scoring at 12As.16 students achieved 11As in the SPM examination apart from 13 students scoring 10As. SMK Kuching High is one of the top 10 schools in Sarawak.

Extracurricular activities

05th Kuching City Scout Group
SMK Kuching High Scout Group, which was founded in 1963, is the 05th scout group in Kuching City. 05th Kuching Scout has around 150 members, which are divided into the junior, senior and rover crew sections. On 22 February 2003, in conjunction with BP Day, a group of former 5th Kuching Scouts decided to form the B-P GUILD – KHS, an association of former 5th Kuching Scouts, who wish to remain, or become, full members of the Scout movement. The GUILD is open to all 5th Kuching Scouts, both present or former,  over 18, male or female, who accepts the aims of the Guild and who are prepared to make, or re-affirm, the Scout Promise. The Scout Band was formed by the Scout group, as a supplement to the Scout activities. It is the first Scout band in the state.

Chinese Language Society
The Chinese Language Society (古晉中學華文學會) was established under the auspices of students and Chinese language teachers. A room inside an isolated concrete hut in front of the Administrative had been allocated for the society's activities and storage. However, it was demolished to give way to development after the Millennium.

The society aims to conserve Chinese cultural heritage and its language usage among students which is exemplified through several efforts viz the publication of societal magazines (like 'Rushing Waves'- "奔浪", 'Staying like green mountains and water' - "留往若青山綠水" and 'Unending chase' - "沒有終點的追逐" ) besides the organisation of various activities that promulgate Chinese literature, such as the annual "KHS Chinese Literature Camp", Chinese Drama Competition, debates, forum, and the annual ethnic-spirit themed performance. Weekly activities, which consist of a choir, arts and crafts, Chinese calligraphy and other recreational activities, are held on Saturdays at the ground floor of Block 3.

To promote the production and admiration of creative pieces among the students, a Notice Board nicknamed the sunflower "向日葵版"  displayed students' writings and art works at the left entrance of the Administrative block. This was lost in the fire in 2009.

Cooperatives Ltd
With the registration number E-1-0497, the school's cooperatives is named Koperasi SMK Kuching High Berhad and was established in 1999. Functioning a consumer based cooperative inside the school, it aims to help its members obtain quality and reasonably priced goods. Another aim of its founding was to inculcate thrift and entrepreneur nature among the students. The main activity is to sell square book, graph pad, NILAM record, long book, file, PJK Tee shirt and PJK track bottom to the students.

In 2009, the cooperative celebrated its 10th anniversary and it was the second runner up in the Quality Secondary School Cooperatives (Category A Award). Also, on 23 June 2009, the cooperative organised a school-level celebration of the National Day Cooperative Day.

Girl Guide Movement
The Girl Guide Movement started in Kuching High School in October 1971. It is led by captains, lieutenants, and teachers-in-charge. The company is registered and known as 19th Kuching Girl Guide Company. There are 6 patrols in the company, which are Bougainvillea, Hibiscus, Daisy, Lily, Orchid and Rose. Each patrol is led by a patrol leader.

Prefectorial Board
The prefectorial board assembles all the school prefects under Madam Wong Kean Ngiap, Madam Yong Mei Chin, Madam Huan Chan Ping, Ms. Si Hui Ling.

Activities organised by the board include spot checks, Sports Day duties, Teacher's Day celebration and Year End Prize Giving Ceremony. The board also performs everyday duties in the morning and during recess.

It is noticeable that there are two kinds of prefect uniform for both morning session and afternoon session. Morning session prefects are easily identified as they wear black pants/skirts, black socks, black shoes along with a necktie and prefect tag whereas afternoon session prefects only has a necktie and a prefect tag onto their default uniform.

Senior prefects of the morning session also puts on blazers during special events.(Excluding Sports Day)

St. John Ambulance

Established in 1971, SMK Kuching High St. John Ambulance carries the motto ‘Pro Utilitate Hominum’, which means ‘For the service of mankind’ in Latin. It has been producing members with skills in First Aid and Nursing, who volunteers to provide first aid services in various occasions. Their skills are often recognised in various competitions, such as winning the inter-division first aid and nursing competition in the Cadet Ambulance (2008), Cadet Nursing (2006 & 2007), Adult Ambulance (2007) and Adult Nursing Category (2006). Its members had also been chosen to represent Sarawak to the National First Aid and Nursing Competition.

Chinese Ochestra Tiong Hua 
Since 1958, some students of Kuching High School started to play chinese musical instruments. In the mid of October, 1984, a Chinese Ochestra group is formed. At first, it only allow female students to participate the group which lasts until the establishment.

The Chinese Ochestra Tiong Hua (晋中华乐团) is officially established in 1991. The Chinese Ochestra Tiong Hua received strong support of the Nanyan Orchestra (南雁民族管弦乐团) and performed in the Teacher’s Day celebrations, awards ceremonies and other school activities, and was well received.

From 2004 to 2006, the Chinese Ochestra Tiong Hua grew up under the leadership of the Teochew Khiaw Club Kuching (潮侨乐部潮乐团) of the Kuching Teochew Association (古晋潮州公会). Until 2007, the Chinese Ochestra Tiong Hua officially became a sub-orchestra of the Orchestra Traditional Oriental Kuching (东方民乐团) under the introduction of the student leadership.

Former principals 

This is a list of principals which have had administered the school since its establishment as a government-aided school in 1963.

 Hsu Yao Dong
 Wang Zhong Lin
 Digi G. H. Dilts
 Quentin Hsu Kwang Thai
 Michael Chang Yit Yong
 Cheong Poh Kok
 William Ong Kim Sen
 Wong Mee King
 Fong Chee Hung
 Chong Tong Liapo (Acting)
 Samuel Tan Yan Pheong
 Michael Chang Yit Yong
 Wang Chang Chung
 Bong Muk Shin – left the school in November 2002 and became the Director of Special Education in the Ministry of Education
 Thomas Lau Ing Ngan – received the Pingat Perkhidmatan Bakti (PPB) from Perak in 2007
 Ivor Emmanuel Lim Ho Huat
 Phang Chun Yow
 Tan Kiang Tuang

Achievements 
The school has been named Sarawak's most promising school and Chief Minister Excellent School. Muhyiddin Yassin, the then Deputy Prime Minister  who was also the nation's Education Minister praised Kuching High School as "a success story of the national education system".

References

External links 
 

Educational institutions established in 1916
Secondary schools in Sarawak
National secondary schools in Malaysia
1916 establishments in Sarawak
Chinese-language schools in Malaysia
Secondary schools in Malaysia